"Remember Me This Way" is a song by English glam rock singer Gary Glitter, written by Glitter with Mike Leander and produced by Mike Leander. Unlike Glitter's previous singles this was a slow ballad that surprised many at the time. Nevertheless, it went on to peak at No. 3 on the UK Singles Chart. The single features the non-album track, "It's Not a Lot (But It's All I Got)" as its B-side, which was exclusive to the single.

Track listing
"Remember Me This Way" – 4:18
"It's Not a Lot (But It's All I Got)" – 2:26

Chart performance

Certifications

References

External links
 

1974 songs
Gary Glitter songs
Songs written by Mike Leander
Songs written by Gary Glitter